Jakub Żubrowski (born 21 March 1992) is a Polish footballer who plays as a midfielder for Zagłębie Lubin.

Club career
On 27 July 2020 he signed a three-year contract with Zagłębie Lubin.

Career statistics

Club

References

External links
 

1992 births
Sportspeople from Szczecin
Living people
Polish footballers
Association football midfielders
Stal Mielec players
Korona Kielce players
Zagłębie Lubin players
Ekstraklasa players
I liga players
II liga players
III liga players